The electrical penetration graph or EPG is a system used by biologists to study the interaction of insects such as aphids, thrips, and leafhoppers with plants. Therefore, it can also be used to study the basis of plant virus transmission, host plant selection by insects and the way in which insects can find and feed from the phloem of the plant. It is a simple system consisting of a partial circuit which is only completed when a species such as aphids, which are the most abundantly studied, inserts its stylet into the plant in order to probe the plant as a suitable host for feeding. The completed circuit is displayed visually as a graph with different waveforms indicating either different insect activities such as saliva excretion or the ingestion of cellular contents or indicating which tissue type has been penetrated (i.e. phloem, xylem or mesophyll). So far, around ten different graphical waveforms are known, correlating with different insect/plant interaction events.

The Circuit 
The circuit connects to the insect via a 20 μm gold or platinum wire and to the plant via a copper electrode placed in the soil. The circuit also passes through, normally, a one gigaohm resistor and a 50x amplifier before the results are stored digitally and interpreted by a computer to calculate the final graph.

See also 
 Plant Viruses
 Epidemiology
 Aphididae
 Insect

References 
 Tjallingii, W.F. (1988). Electrical recording of stylet penetration activities. In: A.K. Minks & P. Harrewijn (eds.). Aphids, their biology, natural enemies and control, 95-108.
 Martin, B.; Collar, J.L.; Tjallingii, W.F.; Fereres, A. (1997). Intracellular ingestion and salivation may cause the acquisition and inoculation of non-persistently transmitted plant viruses. Journal of General Virology, 78, 2701-2705.
 Sauge M.H.; Lambert P.; Pascal T. (2012). Co-localisation of host plant resistance QTLs affecting the performance and feeding behaviour of the aphid Myzus persicae in the peach tree. Heredity, 108 (3), 292-301.
 Giordanengo P. (2014). EPG-Calc: a PHP-based script to calculate electrical penetration graph (EPG) parameters. Arthropod-Plant Interactions, 8(2):163-169.

External links 
 EPG-systems
 EPG-Calc

Entomology equipment
Phytopathology
Environmental Sampling Equipment